Matthew Calbraith Butler (March 8, 1836April 14, 1909) was a Confederate soldier, an American military commander and attorney and politician from South Carolina. He served as a major general in the Confederate States Army during the American Civil War, postbellum three-term United States Senator, and a major general in the United States Army during the Spanish–American War.

Early life and career
Butler was born at Eagle's Crag near Greenville, South Carolina, to a large and prominent family of politicians and military men. His grandfather was U.S. Congressman William Butler. His mother, Jane Tweedy Perry of Rhode Island, was the sister of Commodore Oliver Hazard Perry and Matthew Calbraith Perry, for whom Matthew Calbraith Butler is named. His father, William Butler, Jr., was a Congressman beginning in 1841.

His uncle Andrew Butler was a U.S. Senator from South Carolina and uncle Pierce Mason Butler was Governor of South Carolina. One of Matthew Butler's first cousins was Congressman Preston Brooks, who assaulted Senator Charles Sumner in 1856 on the floor of the U.S. Senate with a cane. He said it was because Sumner had insulted Senator Andrew Butler, at whose home Matthew lived as a young man. Two of Butler's first cousins twice removed were James Bonham (killed at the Battle of the Alamo) and Confederate General Milledge Luke Bonham.

In 1848 Butler went with his father to Arkansas but returned in 1851 to live with his uncle, who resided in Edgefield, South Carolina. He received his initial education in the city's Edgefield Academy, and then attended the South Carolina College, where he was a member of the Delta Kappa Epsilon fraternity, graduating in 1856. He studied law, was admitted to the state's bar association in 1857, and began practicing as a lawyer in Edgefield. He was elected to the South Carolina House of Representatives in 1860, but resigned in 1861 when the American Civil War began.

Marriage and family
On February 25, 1858, Butler married Maria Calhoun Pickens. She was the daughter of Francis Wilkinson Pickens, who was elected as governor of the state.

Civil War years

During the Civil War, Butler served in the cavalry in the Confederate Army of Northern Virginia, serving in Hampton's Legion, attaining the rank of captain on June 12, 1861, and then Major on July 21, 1861. When the legion's cavalry battalion was consolidated with the 4th South Carolina Battalion and became the 2nd South Carolina Cavalry Regiment on August 22, 1862, Butler was elected its colonel. Participating in many major actions with Hampton's Legion and the 2nd SC Cavalry, Butler lost his right foot to rifle fire at Battle of Brandy Station. He attained the rank of brigadier general in February 1864 and was referred to as "General Butler" in the postwar period.

Butler led a brigade in Wade Hampton's division of the Cavalry Corps. When Hampton took command of that corps, Butler became division commander. Late in the war, he transferred to the Carolinas together with Lt. Gen. Hampton, leading a division at the Battle of Bentonville. General Butler was wounded again in that action.

Postbellum
Financially ruined as a result of the war, Butler resumed his career as a lawyer in Edgefield. He was elected to the South Carolina House of Representatives beginning in 1866. He became a member of the Democratic Party and ran unsuccessfully for lieutenant governor in 1870 during the Reconstruction era. He was a member of the pro-black Union Reform party.

In July 1876, Butler defended two white farmers in court in their complaint of being denied free passage on Main Street of Hamburg, South Carolina, when the local chapter of the black militia, part of the National Guard, was parading on Independence Day. In court, Butler demanded that militia members turn over their arms to him, which they refused. Hundreds of white paramilitary members came to town and attacked the armory, where the militia company had taken refuge. They killed two freedmen on the street, including the town marshal, and later murdered five freedmen they had taken prisoner. One white man had been killed in early gunfire (see Hamburg massacre).

In 1877, after Federal troops had been withdrawn under a national Democratic compromise, Reconstruction ended. The Democratic Party regained control of the state in the 1876 elections. The South Carolina state legislature elected Butler to the United States Senate. During Senate hearings on his election, Butler was accused by Edgefield African-American leader Harrison N. Bouey of threatening to kill him and other local men. Butler served in the U.S. Senate for three terms, from 1877 to 1895, but lost for re-election in the South Carolina legislature to Benjamin Tillman, who was popular after serving as governor. In 1890 while serving in the Senate, Butler introduced a bill to provide federal aid to African Americans who would emigrate to Africa to promote segregation, sparking a national debate.

While in the Senate, Butler served on the Senate Foreign Relations, Territories, Military Affairs, Naval Affairs, Interstate Commerce, Civil Service and Retrenchment committees.

Butler practiced law in Washington, D.C., until 1898, when he was appointed major general of U.S. Volunteers during the Spanish–American War. He was one of a handful of former Confederate officers (along with Fitzhugh Lee, Thomas L. Rosser, and Joseph Wheeler) to serve in the U.S. Army during that war. After the American victory that year, he supervised the evacuation of Spanish troops from Cuba. He was honorably discharged from the U.S. Army on April 15, 1899. In 1899 General Butler joined the Pennsylvania Commandery of the Military Order of Foreign Wars.

In 1903, Butler was elected vice president of the Southern Historical Society. In 1904 he relocated to Mexico, where he served as president of a mining company. Having been a widower for years since his wife Maria died, in 1906 he married Nannie Whitman.

They returned to Washington, DC. Butler died there in 1909 while semi-retired. His body was returned to Edgefield, South Carolina, where he was buried in the city's Willow Brook Cemetery.

The Matthew C. Butler Camp #12 of the South Carolina Society of the Military Order of the Stars and Bars is named in his honor.

See also

 List of American Civil War generals (Confederate)

Notes

References
 Boyd, James Penny; Vital Questions of the Day: Or Historic and Economic Reviews of the Issues of Labor ... Tariff Legislation ..., Publisher's union, (1894)
 Burton, Orville Vernon; My Father's House Are Many Mansions: Family and Community in Edgefield, South Carolina, UNC Press, (1987) .
 Eicher, John H., and Eicher, David J., Civil War High Commands, Stanford University Press, 2001, .
 Emerson, W. Eric; Sons of Privilege: The Charleston Light Dragoons in the Civil War, University of South Carolina Press, (2005) .
 Hess, Stephen; America's Political Dynasties, Transaction Publishers, (1997) .
 Madigan, Patrick F.; A Biographical Index of American Public Men, BiblioBazaar, (2008) .
 Martin, Samuel J., Southern Hero, Matthew Calbraith Butler, Stackpole Books, (2001)  .
 Porter, Robert Percival; Industrial Cuba: Being a Study of Present Commercial and Industrial Conditions, with Suggestions as to the Opportunities Presented in the Island for American Capital, Enterprise, and Labour, G. P. Putnam's Sons, (1899).
 Wakelyn, Jon L., Biographical Dictionary of the Confederacy, Greenwood Press, 1977, .
 Warner, Ezra J., Generals in Gray: The Lives of the Confederate Commanders, Louisiana State University Press, 1959, 
 Welsh, Jack D.; Medical Histories of Confederate Generals, Kent State University Press, (1999) .
 Wittenberg, Eric J., Rhea, Gordon C.; "Glory Enough for All:" Sheridan's Second Raid and the Battle of Trevilian Station, University of Nebraska Press, (2007) .
 United States Congress; Official Congressional Directory (1882).

Further reading
 Brooks, Ulysses Robert, Butler and His Cavalry in the War of Secession 1861–1865, original date of publication 1909, republished, 1991 J.J. Fox, Camden, South Carolina: South Carolina Regimentals Series, by Guild Bindery Press, Oxford Miss.
 Martin, Samuel J., Southern Hero: Matthew Calbraith Butler, Confederate General, Hampton Redshirt, and U.S. Senator. Mechanicsburg, Pennsylvania: Stackpole Books, 2001. .
 Official Report of the "Battle of Hamburg" (a.k.a. "Hamburg Massacre")

External links

1836 births
1909 deaths
American military personnel of the Spanish–American War
Confederate States Army major generals
United States Army generals
People from Greenville County, South Carolina
People of South Carolina in the American Civil War
South Carolina Democrats
Democratic Party United States senators from South Carolina
Butler-Belmont family
American people of English descent
Perry family
19th-century American politicians
University of South Carolina alumni
Southern Historical Society